Peter Oppenheimer is the former senior vice president and Chief Financial Officer of  Apple Inc and has been a member of the board of directors of Goldman Sachs since 2014.

Oppenheimer spent 18 years at Apple, reporting directly to CEO Tim Cook and serving on the company's executive committee.  As CFO, Oppenheimer oversaw the controller, treasury, investor relations, tax, information systems, internal audit, facilities, corporate development, and human resources functions. He retired from Apple in 2014.

Education
Oppenheimer attended California Polytechnic State University where he was a member of the Alpha Gamma Rho fraternity. He graduated with a BA in Agricultural Business in 1985, later receiving an MBA from Santa Clara University, both with honors.

In 2015, Oppenheimer and his wife, Mary Beth, made a $20 million cash donation to Cal Poly, the university's largest to date.

Career
Oppenheimer spent six years in the Information Technology Consulting Practice with Coopers and Lybrand (now PricewaterhouseCoopers) where he managed financial, systems engagements for clients in the insurance, telecommunications, transportation and banking industries. Oppenheimer then joined Automatic Data Processing (ADP), where he was Chief Financial Officer of the Claims Services Division.

In 1996, Oppenheimer joined Apple as controller for the Americas.  In 1997, he was promoted to vice president and Worldwide Sales controller and then to corporate controller.

On March 3, 2014, Oppenheimer announced that he would be joining the Board of Directors of Goldman Sachs as an independent director. On March 4, 2014, he announced that he would retire from Apple at the end of September, 2014.

References

Chief financial officers
Living people
Apple Inc. employees
Apple Inc. executives
California Polytechnic State University alumni
Santa Clara University alumni
ADP (company)
1963 births